Holthuisana festiva is a species of freshwater crab in the family Gecarcinucidae. The species is endemic to New Guinea.

References 

Animals described in 1911